Zbigniew Dregier (born 17 July 1935) is a Polish former basketball player. He competed in the men's tournament at the 1960 Summer Olympics, and the 1964 Summer Olympics.

References

External links
 

1935 births
Living people
Polish men's basketball players
1967 FIBA World Championship players
Olympic basketball players of Poland
Basketball players at the 1960 Summer Olympics
Basketball players at the 1964 Summer Olympics
People from Volyn Oblast